The Venezuelan Ambassador in Beijing is the official representative of the Government in Caracas to the Government of China.

List of representatives

References

China
Venezuela
Ambassadors
Ambassadors of Venezuela to China